The Colombo Post is a Sri Lankan English-language weekly newspaper, published every Tuesday.

External links
The Colombo Post Website

English-language newspapers published in Sri Lanka
Weekly newspapers published in Sri Lanka
Mass media in Colombo